2% can refer to:

2% Milk, see fat content of milk
Lembeek's 2%, a Belgian beer

See also
One percent (disambiguation)
99% (disambiguation)